Ayuntamiento is the general term for the town council, or cabildo, of a municipality or, sometimes, as is often the case in Spain and Latin America, for the municipality itself.  is mainly used in Spain; in Latin America  is also for municipal governing bodies, especially the executive ones, where the legislative body and the executive body are two separate entities. In Catalan-speaking parts of Spain, municipalities generally use the Catalan cognate, while Galician ones use the word , Astur-Leonese  and Basque .  Since  is a metonym for the building in which the council meets, it also translates to "city/town hall" in English.

Historically 
With the eighteenth-century Bourbon Reforms in New Spain, which created intendancies and weakened the power of the viceroy, the ayuntamientos "became the institution representing the interests of the local and regional oligarchical groups then setting deep roots into their territories."  The Spanish Constitution of 1812 called for the transformation of the ayuntamiento, previously dominated by elites, into a representative institution with elections. Article 310 called for the establishment of an ayuntamiento for all settlements with 1,000 inhabitants.
 
The term  was often preceded by the word  ("most excellent"), when referring to the council. This phrase is often abbreviated "Exc.mo Ay.to ". Other names for ayuntamiento have been casa de cabildo, casa capitular, casa consistorial and casa del concejo.

Local legislative body
In Latin America several terms exist for the legislative bodies of municipalities. The term  is used in Argentina, Chile, Colombia, Costa Rica, and Peru. Puerto Rican municipalities have a legislatura municipal. Executive functions in most of these countries is handled by an executive , the mayor (not to be confused with the historic , who was a magistrate).

See also
 Ayuntamiento (Spain) for the specific institution of local government in Spain.
 Cabildo
 Comuna
 Encomienda
 Municipalidad
 Municipio
 Corregidor
 Alcalde
 Alcalde ordinario
 Sargento mayor
 Corregidor
 Cabildo (council)
 Síndico
 Corregimiento
 Teniente a guerra

References

Notes

Further reading
Camacho-Pichardo, Gloria. "La reorganización territorial de los ayuntamientos en México bajo la dictadura de Antonio López de Santa Anna, 1853-1855." La Colmena 98 (2018): 63-80.
De Gortari Rabiela, Hira. "Ayuntamientos y ciudadanos: la ciudad de México y los estados: 1812-1827." Tiempos de América: revista de historia, cultura y territorio 1 (1997): 113-130.
Moreno Plata, Miguel. La reorganización territorial del ayuntamiento rural: un enfoque alternativo para la modernización de los municipios rurales del país en los umbrales del siglo XXI. Plaza y Valdés, 2001.
Pazos, María Luisa Pazos. El ayuntamiento de la ciudad de México en el siglo XVII: continuidad institucional y cambio social. Diss. Universidad de Sevilla, 1997.

Spanish language
Municipalities of Mexico
Municipalities of Spain
Subdivisions of the Spanish Empire